The International School of Helsinki is an independent, co-educational international school in Helsinki, Finland. It was founded as the British Preparatory School in 1963.

ISH is an International Baccalaureate World School, with IB programs offered from Kindergarten to Grade 12. The school was first authorised to offer the IB Diploma program in 1993. Instruction is in English, with the school divided into a Lower School (Kindergarten through Grade 5) and Upper School (Grades 6-12).

The school has a full-day program. Its school years run from early August to early June.

Accreditation and Authorization

Accreditation
In addition to the International Baccalaureate, the school is also accredited by the following organizations:
 New England Association of Schools and Colleges
 Council of International Schools

Authorization
ISH became the first school in Finland fully authorised to offer all three of the International Baccalaureate Programme: the Primary Years Programme (PYP), the Middle Years Programme (MYP), and the Diploma Programme in November 2005.

The school's strategic plan, the philosophies of the International Baccalaureate Programmes, along with the Finnish education regulations and the standards set forth by the accrediting agencies mentioned above all contribute to the structure and operation of ISH.

Structure
The school has approximately 415 students of whom some 28% are Finnish nationals. The rest of the school's population is made up of different nationalities. The school is divided into two sections:

ISH Lower School
 1 Programme: Primary Years Programme (PYP), 4 years old - 11 years old.

ISH Upper School
 2 Programmes:
 Middle Years Programme (MYP), 11 years old - 16 years old.
 Diploma Programme (DP) 16 years old - 19 years old.
                
All three programmes share the same campus.

Administration

The school is administered by a Board of Governors elected by the ISH Parents Association to two-year terms.

Facilities
ISH moved into its purpose-built structure in the Ruoholahti district of Helsinki in 1996. The school's facilities include ICT labs, a gymnasium, sports field, library, and media center as well as classrooms equipped with Smart-Boards and other media devices. The school also has a  combined cafeteria/auditorium.

Extracurricular activities
The International School of Helsinki offers a variety of activities. The After School Activities(ASA) Programme is divided into three seasons: Autumn, Winter and Spring. The intended goal of the ASA Programme is to offer students both competitive and non-competitive activities and athletics options. The school is a member of CEESA which allows older students to take part in events alongside students from other international schools in central and Eastern Europe. These include various sports events including soccer, basketball, and volleyball tournaments.

Lower School students have a variety of clubs to choose from, which include arts, comics, dancing, drama, games, music, and various sports.

References

External links 

 International School of Helsinki
 International Baccalaureate Organization
 Central and Eastern European Schools Association

Schools in Helsinki
Helsinki
International schools in Finland
International Baccalaureate schools in Finland
Educational institutions established in 1963
1963 establishments in Finland